is a town located in Fukushima Prefecture, Japan. , the town had an estimated population of 6,315 in 21608 households, and a population density of 170 persons per km².

Geography
Asakawa is located in southern portion of Fukushima prefecture in the floodplain of the Abukuma River. Asakawa has a humid climate (Köppen climate classification Cfa).

Neighboring municipalities
 Fukushima Prefecture
 Shirakawa
 Ishikawa
 Tanagura
 Samegawa

Demographics
Per Japanese census data, the population of Asakawa has declined over the past 40 years.

Demographics
Per Japanese census data, the population of Kunimi has been in decline over the past 70 years.

Climate
Asakawa has a humid climate (Köppen climate classification Cfa).

History
The area of present-day Asakuwa was part of ancient Mutsu Province. The area was mostly tenryō territory under direct control of the Tokugawa Shogunate during the Edo period. After the Meiji Restoration, it was organized as part of Ishikawa District in the Nakadōri region of Iwaki Province. The village of Asakuwa was formed on April 1, 1889, with the creation of the modern municipalities system. It was raised to town status on August 1, 1935. The town expanded on October 1, 1950, by the annexation of the neighboring village of Yamashiraishi.

Economy
The economy of Asakuwa is primarily based on agriculture.

Education
Asakawa has three public elementary schools and one public junior high school operated by the town government. The town does not have a high school.
Asakawa Middle School
Asakawa Elementary School
Asakawa Yamashiraishi Elementary School
Asakawa Satoshiraishi Elementary School

Transportation

Railway
 JR East – Suigun Line
  -

Highway

Local attractions
Yoshida Tomizo Memorial Museum

Noted people from Asakawa
Tomizo Yoshida - pathologist

References

External links

 

 
Towns in Fukushima Prefecture